Karim Yassen is a Kurdish professor, who is known for finding the enzyme which causes gum disease. The research was done at Jagiellonian University in Poland.

He works in the department of biology of Irbil's Salahaddin University-Erbil as a lecturer.

References

Kurdish academics
Kurdish scholars
Kurdish scientists
Year of birth missing (living people)
Living people